Caio Alan Tem Catem Gonçalves (born 26 January 1997), simply known as Caio, is a Brazilian footballer who currently plays as a goalkeeper for Mirassol.

Career statistics

Club

Honours
Athletico Paranaense
Campeonato Paranaense: 2018
J.League Cup / Copa Sudamericana Championship: 2019

References

External links

1997 births
Living people
Brazilian footballers
Association football goalkeepers
Campeonato Brasileiro Série A players
Campeonato Brasileiro Série C players
Club Athletico Paranaense players
Esporte Clube Água Santa players
Maringá Futebol Clube players
Mirassol Futebol Clube players
Campeonato de Portugal (league) players
Louletano D.C. players
Brazilian expatriate footballers
Brazilian expatriate sportspeople in Portugal
Expatriate footballers in Portugal